Eqalugaarsuit (old spelling: Eqalugârssuit) is a settlement in the Kujalleq municipality in southern Greenland, located southeast of Qaqortoq and northwest of Alluitsup Paa. Its population was 49 in 2020.

Until January, 2009, the settlement—along Qassimiut and Saarloq, as well as 13 sheep farms—belonged to the Qaqortoq municipality. On January 1, 2009, the settlement became part of the Kujalleq municipality, when the Narsaq, Qaqortoq, and Nanortalik municipalities ceased to exist. The settlements are presently governed by a joint settlement council.

Economy

The main occupations are hunting and fishing. There are currently plans of introducing muskox to the surrounding area, as a source of food and traditional hide, called qiviut, and as a tourist attraction.

Infrastructure 
The settlement has two general stores, operated by KNI. There is also a church, a service house, and a home for the elderly. The settlement has its own school--Daanialiup atuarfia—presently with approximately 30 pupils. The school consists of three classrooms, a kitchen, and an office. The settlement has its own soccer field.

There are no cars in the settlement, the only motorized transportation is by tractors or 4-wheel-drive buggies. The settlement has a heliport. The harbour has a wharf, a port, and a separate fishing dock.

Population 
Most towns and settlements in southern Greenland exhibit negative growth patterns over the last two decades, with many settlements rapidly depopulating. The population of Eqalugaarsuit has decreased nearly a third relative to the 1990 levels, and over 12 percent relative to the 2000 levels.

References 

Populated places in Greenland